Barru is capital of Barru Regency in South Sulawesi province of Indonesia.

Administration 
 Barru comprises 10 villages, Sumpang Binangae (population 9,817), Coppo (4,823), Tuwung (3,951), Anabanua (1,874), Palakka (2,941), Galung (1,892), Tompo (2,149), Sepee (2,910), Mangempang (5,354) and Siawung (2,622).

References 

Populated places in South Sulawesi
Regency seats of South Sulawesi